ROLF – the biggest dealer holding in the Russian Federation, one of the pioneers at the Russian automobile market. It was founded on August 5, 1991. Its headquarters is in Moscow city. The company is engages in selling of new cars and used cars, motorcycles, automobiles accessories, as well as service maintenance of cars and motorcycles and rendering of services in crediting and insurance.

Management
The company is owned by Cyprus trusts, its beneficiaries are the family of the founder of the company, Mr. Sergey Petrov.

The CEO of the retail subdivision of Rolf since February 1, 2017, is Ms. Svetlana Vinogradova.

In November 2019, Sergey Petrov has announced the intention to sell the Rolf Company and the formation of the closed list of applicants for purchase of the car dealer. At the beginning of 2021 the management declared the refusal to sell the company.

In February 2021, the CEO of the company Ms. Svetlana Vinogradova declared that Rolf considers the possibility of transfer to the IPO and already started the preparation work. In December 2021, the CEO of Rolf Company confirmed to Bloomberg News the possibility of IPO in the second half of 2022.

Activity 
The first dealer center of Rolf was opened in Moscow city in 1991. As on January 1, 2021, the retail subdivision includes 59 show-rooms, located in 20 districts (15in Moscow and 5 in Saint-Petersburg). They represent 20 automobile brands and one motorcycle brand (Audi, BMW, BMW Motorrad, Chrysler, Ford, Genesis, Jeep, Jaguar, Hyundai, Kia, Land Rover/Range Rover, Lexus, Mazda, MercedesBenz, Mitsubishi, Nissan, Porsche, Renault, Skoda, Toyota, Volkswagen).

Performance indicator 
Table No.1. The number of new cars and used cars sold in a year (to individuals and legal entities)

Bonds
Rolf Company has placed two bonded loans at the Moscow stock exchange.

The debut release and placement of bonds of the company took place in March 2019. Their volume was equal to 3 billion rubles with circulation period of 3 years and the rate of the coupon of 10.45% per annum.

In February 2020 Rolf placed the second issue of bonds for 4.5 billion rubles with circulation period of 2 years and the rate of the coupon of 9% per annum.

In December 2020 the Rolf Company placed offers on two issues of bonds with the total amount up to 7.5 billion rubles. The company has repaid the bonds shown to repayment for the amount of 1.8 billion rubles.

Ratings and rankings
In July 2020 the Moody's rating agency has assigned the corporate rating (Corporate Family Rating CFR) to the Rolf Company at the level of "B1". The forecast for the rating is "stable".

In August 2020 the Expert RA rating agency has confirmed the rating of solvency of the non-financial company Rolf at the "ruA-“level. The forecast for the rating is “stable".

In 2020 Rolf took the following places in authoritative business rankings:

 Forbes: 200 largest private companies of Russia – 2020. Rolf – 38th place;
 500: Rating of Russian businesses – 2020 – 62nd place;
 50 most expensive Russian brands Brand Finance Russia 50 — 35th place.

The Rolf Company won the first place in the ranking of car dealers annually released by the “Auto Business Review” magazine:

 In terms of revenue – since 2013.
 In terms of sales of new cars – since 2014.
 In terms of used car sales – since 2013.

The "Dealer No. 1" in the spb-adlr.ru portal ranking in terms of sales of new cars in St. Petersburg city since 2011.

References

External links
 rolf-service.ru 
 Rolf.ru 

Auto dealerships
Companies based in Moscow
Russian companies established in 1991
Retail companies established in 1991
Automotive companies of Russia